The 2015 United Nations Security Council election was held on 15 October 2015 during the 70th session of the United Nations General Assembly, held at United Nations Headquarters in New York City. The elections are for five non-permanent seats on the UN Security Council for two-year mandates commencing on 1 January 2016.
In accordance with the Security Council's rotation rules, whereby the ten non-permanent UNSC seats rotate among the various regional blocs into which UN member states traditionally divide themselves for voting and representation purposes, the five available seats are allocated as follows:

Two for Africa (held by Chad and Nigeria)
One for the Asia-Pacific Group (held by Jordan) 
One for Latin America and the Caribbean (held by Chile)
One for the Eastern European Group (held by Lithuania)

The five members will serve on the Security Council for the 2016–17 period. The countries elected were Egypt, Senegal, Uruguay, Japan, and Ukraine. In each vote there were as many vacancies as there were candidates on the ballot.

This was the last time a Security Council election was held in the month of October. On 18 September 2014, the General Assembly adopted Resolution 68/307 to push the elections back to six months prior to the beginning of the newly elected Council members' terms.

Candidates

African Group

Asia-Pacific Group 
 — Withdrew on 6 September 2014 in favour of Japan.

Eastern European Group

Latin American and Caribbean Group

Result

African and Asia-Pacific Groups

Latin American and Caribbean Group

Eastern European Group

See also
List of members of the United Nations Security Council
Japan and the United Nations

References

2015 elections
2015
Non-partisan elections
2015 in international relations
October 2015 events